Identity Crisis is the ninth and final studio album by English glam rock band Sweet. Originally released only in Germany and Mexico via Polydor Records, it was recorded from 1980–81 and finally released after the band's break-up in 1981.

Track listing
All songs written and composed by Steve Priest, Andy Scott and Mick Tucker except where noted.
Side one
"Identity Crisis" – 4:06
"New Shoes" – 3:22
"Two into One" – 2:37
"Love Is the Cure" (Scott) – 3:40
"It Makes Me Wonder" – 3:24
Side two
"Hey Mama" – 3:28
"Falling in Love" – 4:42
"I Wish You Would" (Billy Boy Arnold) – 3:12
"Strange Girl" – 4:30

Personnel
Sweet
Steve Priest – bass guitar, lead vocals, backing vocals
Andy Scott – guitars, co-lead vocals (track 5), backing vocals
Mick Tucker – drums, backing vocals
Technical
Louis Austin – engineer

References

The Sweet albums
1982 albums
Polydor Records albums